Piedra Roja was a music festival in Chile noted as an expression of the hippie counterculture in South America. Following the success of Woodstock, a similar music festival was held in Chile between 10 and 12 October 1970 in the eastern area of Santiago. Among others, the following bands performed in the festival: Aguaturbia, Los Blops, Lágrima Seca and Los Jaivas. Similarly to Woodstock, chaos marked the festival, involving problems with sound, drugs and delinquency. The festival showed for the first time that the young population in Chile during that time was a group to reckon with. It also showed the increasing social tension that would end in the 1973 Chilean coup d'état.

See also
List of historic rock festivals

References

External links 
2011 website on Piedra Roja

Music festivals in Chile
Music festivals established in 1970
Rock festivals in Chile
Pop music festivals
Counterculture festivals
1970 music festivals